Iara is a commune in the southern part of Cluj County, Transylvania, Romania. It is composed of thirteen villages: Agriș (Ruhaegres), Borzești (Berkes), Buru (Borrév), Cacova Ierii (Aranyosivánfalva), Făgetu Ierii (Bikalat), Iara, Lungești (Szurdoklunzsest), Măgura Ierii (Járamagura), Mașca (Macskakő), Ocolișel (Felsőaklos), Surduc (Járaszurdok), Valea Agrișului (Egrespatak) and Valea Vadului (Vádpatak).

Demographics 
According to the census from 2002, the total population of the commune was 4,704 people. Of this population, 90.68% were ethnic Romanians, 6.01% ethnic Romani and 3.16% are ethnic Hungarians.

References 

Communes in Cluj County
Localities in Transylvania
Mining communities in Romania